Riina Maidre (born on 26 January 1982 in Tallinn) is an Estonian actress.

She has been studied at Estonian Academy of Music and Theatre's Drama School. She has worked at Estonian Drama Theatre and Von Krahl Theatre. Besides theatrical roles she has also played on several films and television series.

Selected filmography

 2005 Sagedused (role: Liina)
 2007 Georg (role: Theatre make-up artist)
 2007 Mis iganes, Aleksander! (role: Liisi)
 2008 Käsky (role: Beata Hallenberg)
 2008 Taarka (role: Tato)
 2011 Kõik muusikud on kaabakad (role: Leila)
 2017-2018 Siberi võmm (role: Liki Erelt)
 2022 Apteeker Melchior. Viirastus (role: Odele)

References

Living people
1982 births
Estonian stage actresses
Estonian film actresses
Estonian television actresses
21st-century Estonian actresses
Estonian Academy of Music and Theatre alumni
Actresses from Tallinn